Priochirus unicolor is a species of beetles belonging to the family Staphylinidae. This species can be found in Indonesia.

Taxonomy
Francis de Laporte de Castelnau described this species in 1835, placing it in the genus Leptochirus. It continued to be classified in this genus by Wilhelm Ferdinand Erichson (1840) and Albert-Auguste Fauvel (1905). Those who placed it in the genus Priochirus included Karl Borromaeus Maria Josef Heller (1898).

Malcolm Cameron classified it in the Triacanthochirus subgenus of Priochirus.

As per a 1920 designation by Robert Lucas, it is the type species of the subgenus Eutriacanthus .

In 2007, Jie Wu and Hong-Zhang Zhou transferred this species to the genus Plastus; this has been accepted by the Catalogue of Palaearctic Coleoptera.

Distribution
Its type locality is Java. Fauvel wrote that its range included Sumatra, the Banggai Islands, Mentawai Islands, Bodjo, Borneo, Malacca, Cambodje.

In 1898, Heller listed its distribution as Java and the Mentawai Islands.

P. J. M. Greenslade described its range as comprising Indochina, Sumatra, and Java.

Wu and Zhao reported observing it in Yunnan Province, China; they also listed Vietnam as part of its range.

Description
Laport recorded its dimensions as 5½ lignes (≈) long and 1¼ lignes (≈) wide. Erichson recorded its length as 6 lignes  (≈). Max Bernhauer  recorded its length as

References

Further reading

 

Beetles described in 1835
Osoriinae
Insects of Indonesia